James Frederick Almand (born October 18, 1948) is a Virginia attorney and retired judge, and was a Democratic legislator representing Arlington, Virginia. He served in the Virginia House of Delegates from 1978 to mid-2003, rising to become chair of the powerful House Courts of Justice committee that effectively determines which judicial candidates will become judges and justices in Virginia’s court system. He then served as a Circuit Court judge in the 17th judicial circuit, which comprises Arlington and the City of Falls Church. He retired in December, 2011.

He received undergraduate and law degrees from the College of William and Mary.

References

External links
 

1948 births
Living people
Democratic Party members of the Virginia House of Delegates
College of William & Mary alumni
William & Mary Law School alumni